Colegiul Naţional Mihai Eminescu ('Mihai Eminescu' National College) is a high school in Buzău, Romania, second most important after Colegiul Naţional B.P. Hasdeu. It bears the name of Mihai Eminescu, Romania's  best-known poet. In 2000, it was granted the title of National College by the Ministry of Education and Research of Romania, being one of the two National Colleges in town, and three in Buzău County.

Buildings and structures in Buzău
Schools in Buzău County
National Colleges in Romania
Educational institutions established in 1919
1919 establishments in Romania